Halcyon is a mixed-use development in southern Forsyth County, Georgia, in the Atlanta metropolitan area. It has an Alpharetta postal address, despite not being located within the Alpharetta city limits or even in the same county. Halcyon is located at McFarland Parkway and Georgia State Route 400 (U.S. Route 19).

Halcyon opened its first phase in summer 2019 (Retail Sneak Peek date is set to September 18, 2019), and is planned to contain:
Retail stores 
Restaurants
The "Market Hall", a food hall
"Cinebistro" cinema with in-cinema dining
300 market-rate apartments
160 rental units reserved for senior citizen
73 single-family houses
132 townhouses
480,000 square feet of retail and office space
two hotels
a Mercedes-Benz Experience Center

References

External links
Official website
Developer website

Mixed-use developments in Georgia (U.S. state)
Forsyth County, Georgia
Shopping malls in the Atlanta metropolitan area